The Holy See exercised political and secular influence, as distinguished from its spiritual and pastoral activity, while the pope ruled the Papal States in central Italy.

Origins

Patrimony of Saint Peter
The Lateran Palace was the first significant acquisition of the Church, most probably a gift from Constantine the Great. The example of Constantine was followed by wealthy families of the Roman nobility, Sometimes designated as the Patrimonium Sancti Petri, it was not a separate state, but still subject to the emperor in Byzantium.

Pope Gregory II's defiance of the Byzantine emperor Leo III the Isaurian as a result of the first iconoclastic controversy (726 AD) in the Byzantine Empire, widened the growing divergence between the Byzantine and Carolingian traditions in what was still a unified European Church, as well as facilitating the reduction or removal of Byzantine political control over parts of the Italian Peninsula and eventually led to the establishment of the temporal power of the popes. The Duchy of Rome was an imperial territory under the Exarchate of Ravenna. With the waning of Byzantine control in Italian peninsula, more of the management of the area fell to the popes.

Donation of Pepin
In 751 the Exarchate of Ravenna fell to Lombard King Aistulf. Five years later, Pepin the Short of the Franks defeated the Lombards and granted the lands of the Duchy of Rome as well as territory ceased by the Lombards to the Papacy in what is referred to as the Donation of Pepin, marking the true beginning of the Papal States. The area conferred upon the pope inluded the territory belonging to Ravenna, even cities such as Forlì with their hinterlands, the Lombard conquests in the Romagna and in the Duchy of Spoleto and Benevento, and the Pentapolis (the "five cities" of Rimini, Pesaro, Fano, Senigallia and Ancona). Narni and Ceccano were former papal territories.  effective  However, the medieval Popes were unable to exercise effective sovereignty over these extensive and mountainous territories, given the recalcitrance of their vassals.

For over a thousand years popes ruled as sovereign over an amalgam of territories on the Italian peninsula known as the Papal States, from the capital, Rome. Avignon also came under the jurisdiction of the Papal States in 1348.

Early modern period 

Theologian Robert Bellarmine, in his 16th-century dogmatic work Disputationes strongly affirmed the authority of the pope as the vicar of Christ. However, he reasoned that since Christ did not exercise his temporal power, neither may the pope.

In 1590, Pope Sixtus V had, of his own initiative, placed the first volume of the Disputationes on a new edition of the Index Librorum Prohibitorum for denying that the pope had direct temporal authority over the whole world. The entry concerning Bellarmin reads: "Roberti Bellarmini Disputationes de Controversiis Christianae fidei adversus huius temporis haereticos. Nisi prius ex superioribus regulis recognitae fuerint." However, Sixtus V died before he could promulgate the bull which would have made this new edition of the Index enter into force. Sixtus' successor, Urban VII, asked for an examination and after it was done Bellarmine was exonerated and the book removed from the Index.

Concerning the pastoral and spiritual power of the pope, Bellarmine's "Disputationes, 3 vol. (1586–93), and De potestate summi pontificis in rebus temporalibus (1610; "Concerning the Power of the Supreme Pontiff in Temporal Matters") gave definite form to the theory of papal supremacy."

19th century 
The secular revolutionary movements of the 1800s posed a serious threat to the pope's temporal power. Avignon was seized by revolutionaries during the French Revolution in 1791, ending 450 years of papal sovereignty there. Between 1798 and 1814, the revolutionary French government invaded Italy several times and annexed the Papal States (though the papacy was restored between 1800 and 1809). Napoleon Bonaparte abolished the pope's temporal power in 1809, incorporating Rome and Latium into his First French Empire. Pope Pius VII himself was even taken prisoner by Napoleon. However, the pope's temporal power was restored by the Great powers at the conclusion of the Napoleonic Wars in the 1815 Congress of Vienna. The civil laws of the Napoleonic Code were abolished, and most civil servants were removed from office. In the coming years, rising liberal and nationalist sentiment created popular opposition to the reconstituted clerical government. This led to numerous revolts, which were suppressed by the intervention of the Austrian army.

In November 1848, during the 1848 Revolutions that swept Europe, the assassination of his minister Pellegrino Rossi led Pope Pius IX to flee Rome. During a political rally in February 1849, a young heretic, the Abbé Arduini, described the temporal power of the popes as a "historical lie, a political imposture, and a religious immorality." 

On 9 February 1849, a revolutionary Roman Assembly proclaimed the Roman Republic. Subsequently, the Constitution of the Roman Republic abolished papal temporal power, although the independence of the pope as head of the Catholic Church was guaranteed by article 8 of the "Principi fondamentali". Like the other revolutionary movements of 1848, the Republic was short-lived; Rome was eventually conquered by the French Second Republic, which restored the papacy's temporal power in the region once again.

In 1859–60, the Papal States was invaded by various republican forces seeking a unified Italian state, and lost the provinces of Romagna, Marche and Umbria. These regions were incorporated into the Kingdom of Sardinia (which thereafter became the Kingdom of Italy), and the papacy's temporal power was reduced to Rome and the region of Lazio. At this point, some ultramontane groups proposed that the temporal power be elevated into a dogma. According to Raffaele De Cesare:

However, following the Austro-Prussian War, Austria was forced to recognize the newly-formed Kingdom of Italy. As a result, most clerics lost hope of a return of the former temporal power of the Bishop of Rome. Some, primarily Italian, clergy suggested an ecumenical council to dogmatically define papal infallibility as an article of faith, binding upon the consciences of all Catholic faithful. This doctrinal view, however, initially proposed by Franciscan partisans in opposition to the prerogative of popes to contradict the more favorable decrees of their predecessors, faced significant resistance outside of Italy prior to and during the First Vatican Council.

For practical purposes, the temporal power of the popes ended on 20 September 1870, when the Italian Army breached the Aurelian Walls at Porta Pia and entered Rome. This completed the Unification of Italy (Risorgimento).

See also

References

Sources

Further reading
 The Last Days of Papal Rome

8th-century establishments in the Byzantine Empire
History of the papacy
Religion and politics
Sovereignty
Canon law history
Catholicism and politics
Conflict of laws
History of Catholicism in Italy
International law
Law of Vatican City